Shen Yun Performing Arts is a United States-based non-profit performing arts and entertainment company that tours internationally, producing dance performances and symphony concerts. It is operated by the Falun Gong new religious movement. Shen Yun is composed of eight equally large performing arts companies, with a total of approximately 480 performers. Shen Yun has performed in front of millions and has toured more than 200 cities across Europe, North America, Oceania, and Asia.

Shen Yun was founded in 2006 by Chinese expatriate adherents of Falun Gong, and is based at Falun Gong's  Dragon Springs compound in Deerpark, New York, northwest of New York City, near where the new religious group's leader and founder, Li Hongzhi, and many of his followers also reside. Falun Gong adherents pay to rent the performance venue, promote the show, and sell tickets. After expenses are covered through ticket sales, proceeds go to Shen Yun. The finances of Shen Yun and Falun Gong appear to be linked, with technically separate corporations sharing funds, executives and the same mission. Li Hongzhi describes the Shen Yun performance as a means of "saving" audiences.

Shen Yun performances have received criticism for promoting sectarian doctrines and negative views of evolution, atheism, and homosexuality. The group is promoted by The Epoch Times, a far-right media outlet affiliated with Falun Gong. In 2019, an NBC News assessment concluded that "The Epoch Media Group, along with Shen Yun[...] make up the outreach effort of Falun Gong". The Chinese government bars Shen Yun from performing in China as it considers Falun Gong to be an "anti-society cult" and has attempted to cancel its performances abroad by pressuring theaters and governments.

History and ties to Falun Gong
In 2006, a group of expatriate Chinese Falun Gong practitioners living in North America founded Shen Yun in New York. The stated purpose of the company was to revive Chinese culture and traditions from the time before the Chinese Revolution.

In 2007, the company conducted its first tour with 90 dancers, musicians, soloists, and production staff. Early shows were titled "Chinese Spectacular", "Holiday Wonders", "Chinese New Year Splendor", and "Divine Performing Arts", but now the company performs exclusively under the name "Shen Yun". By 2009, Shen Yun had developed three full companies and orchestras that tour the world simultaneously. By the end of the 2010 season, approximately one million people had seen the troupe perform.

Shen Yun, the media organization The Epoch Times, and a variety of other organizations operate as extensions of the new religious movement Falun Gong. According to 2020 report by Los Angeles Magazine:

Shen Yun operates out of Falun Gong's headquarters in the  Dragon Springs compound in Deerpark, New York, where it has large rehearsal spaces. Dragon Springs is registered as a religious property under the church name Dragon Springs Buddhist. The exact financial and structural connections between Falun Gong, Shen Yun, and The Epoch Times remain unclear. According to NBC News:

Billing and promotion
Shen Yun promotes itself as "a presentation of traditional Chinese culture as it once was: a study in grace, wisdom, and virtues distilled from five millennia of Chinese civilization". The company is described in promotions as reviving Chinese culture following a period of assault and destruction under the Chinese Communist Party. Shen Yun is heavily promoted in major cities with commercials, billboards, and brochures displayed in the streets and in businesses, as well as in television and radio profiles. According to Jia Tolentino, "The ads have to be both ubiquitous and devoid of content so that they can convince more than a million people to pay good money to watch what is, essentially, religious-political propaganda—or, more generously, an extremely elaborate commercial for Falun Dafa’s spiritual teachings and its plight vis-à-vis the Chinese Communist regime."

Shen Yun performances are often produced or sponsored by regional Falun Dafa associations, members of Falun Gong, which in China is considered to be a cult and is banned by the government. Some audience members have objected to the show's promotion strategy, which does not note the religious- and political-themed content of the performance.

In 2021, the troupe began billing its shows as "China Before Communism".

Content

Dance
Large-scale group dance is at the center of Shen Yun productions. Each touring company consists of about 40 male and female dancers, who mainly perform classical Chinese dances, making extensive use of acrobatic and tumbling techniques, forms and postures.

Shen Yun's repertoire draws on stories from Chinese history and legends, such as the legend of Mulan, Journey to the West and Outlaws of the Marsh. It also depicts "the story of Falun Gong today". During the 2010 production, at least two of the 16 scenes depicted "persecution and murder of Falun Gong practitioners" in contemporary China, including the beating of a young mother to death, and the jailing of a Falun Gong protester. In addition to classical Han Chinese dance, Shen Yun also includes elements of Yi, Miao, Tibetan and Mongolian dance.

Shen Yun performs three core elements of classical Chinese dance: bearing (emotion, cultural and ethnic flavor), form (expressive movements and postures), and technical skill (physical techniques of jumping, flipping, and leaping). Shen Yun choreographer Vina Lee has stated that some of the distinct Chinese bearing has been "lost in the process" since the cultural changes of the Communist revolution.

Music
A full Western orchestra leads the melodies. Interspersed between dance sequences, other than the  performances, are operatic singers performing songs which sometimes invoke spiritual or religious themes, including references to the Falun Gong faith. A performance in 2007, for instance, included a reference to the Chakravartin, a figure in Buddhism who turns the wheel of Dharma.

The music for Shen Yun was composed by Jing Xian and Junyi Tan. Three of Shen Yun's performers—flutist Ningfang Chen, erhuist Mei Xuan and tenor Guan Guimin—were recipients of the Chinese Ministry of Culture's "National First Class Performer" awards. Prior to joining Shen Yun, Guan Guimin was well known in China for his work on soundtracks for more than 50 movies and television shows. Other notable performers include  soloist Xiaochun Qi.

Costume and backdrops

Shen Yun's dancers perform wearing intricate costumes, often accompanied by a variety of props. Some costumes are intended to imitate the dress of various ethnicities, while others depict ancient Chinese court dancers, soldiers, or characters from classic stories. Props include colorful handkerchiefs, drums, fans, chopsticks, or silk scarves.

Each Shen Yun piece is set against a digitally projected backdrop, usually depicting landscapes such as Mongolian grasslands, imperial courts, ancient villages, temples, or mountains. Some backdrops contain moving elements, such as digital versions of the dancers, that integrate with the performance.

Tours
Shen Yun's eight companies tour for six months each year, performing in over 130 cities in North America, Europe, Asia, Australia, and Latin America. Notable venues include the David H. Koch Theater at New York's Lincoln Center in Manhattan; the London Coliseum in London, England; the Palais des congrès de Paris; and the Kennedy Center Opera House in Washington, D.C. By the conclusion of Shen Yun's 2010 performance, an estimated one million people had seen the performance worldwide.

Shen Yun does not perform in China and the Chinese government has attempted to cancel Shen Yun performances elsewhere through political pressure exerted by its foreign embassies and consulates. Chinese diplomats have also sent letters to elected officials in the West exhorting them not to attend or otherwise support the performance, which they describe as "propaganda" intended to "smear China's image." Members of the Communist Party's top political consultative body have also expressed concern that China's state-funded arts troupes have been less popular internationally than Shen Yun. Shen Yun representatives say the Chinese government's opposition to the show stems from its depictions of modern-day political oppression in China, and that it includes expressions of traditional Chinese cultural history that the Communist government has tried to suppress.

Shen Yun was scheduled to perform in Hong Kong in January 2010, but the performance was cancelled after the government of Hong Kong refused entry visas to Shen Yun's production crew. Attempts to shut down the show have also been reported by theatres and local governments in various countries including Ecuador, Ireland, Germany and Sweden.

Symphony orchestra
In October 2012, Shen Yun's symphony orchestra made its debut performance at Carnegie Hall in New York. The performance featured conductors Milen Nachev, Keng-Wei Kuo, and Antonia Joy Wilson, and the program included both classical works such as Beethoven's Egmont Overture and Antonio Vivaldi's Concerto in C Major, as well as original compositions that fuse Chinese and Western instruments.

In 2013, the symphony orchestra toured seven American cities. In addition to Carnegie Hall, it performed at the Kennedy Center in Washington, D.C. and Davies Symphony Hall in San Francisco.

Reception
Sarah Crompton of The Daily Telegraph wrote of a 2008 Shen Yun performance:

The 2018 and 2019 performances included lyrics and digital displays disparaging atheism and belief in evolution as "deadly ideas" and "born of the Red Spectre", and is a common complaint of attendees of the performance. Reviewers characterized this content as "anti-evolution", "religious sermon", and "cult propaganda." Many viewers and reviewers complain that such elements are misrepresented by the advertising of a show that in the end "feels more like propaganda than straightforwardly presented cultural heritage." Alix Martichoux from the Houston Chronicle wrote, "For many disgruntled Shen Yun attendees, it's not necessarily that the show itself is bad – though to be fair, some complain it is. Most of the negative reviews were people upset they were blindsided by the political content." Walter Whittemore wrote in The Ledger:

, disparagement of atheism and evolution was still present in the show. Misrepresentation of content in advertising was also a common complaint by viewers, and Falun Gong-affiliated political propaganda has been noted as a prominent element. An outstanding case is described by Jia Tolentino from The New Yorker:

David Robertson, minister of St. Peter's Free Church in Dundee, wrote that he enjoyed the show despite it being "filled with cult messages." He continued:

Claims of Chinese government interference
Shen Yun has claimed that the Chinese government has attempted to stop the group from performing abroad by sending letters or e-mails to theaters in multiple countries, including Ecuador, Ireland, Germany, and Sweden. According to Shen Yun, the Chinese government also attempted to cancel Shen Yun's performance in Hong Kong by rejecting the entry visas of six members.

See also

 Dance in the United States

References

Further reading
 
 The traditional Chinese dance troupe China doesn't want you to see, Nicholas Hune-Brown, theguardian.com, 12 December 2017

External links

 

2006 establishments in New York City
Anti-communism in the United States
Falun Gong propaganda
Companies based in New York (state)
Entertainment companies established in 2006
Dance in the United States
Entertainment companies of the United States
Propaganda art
Propaganda in the United States
 
Orchestras based in New York (state)